Neolipoptena is a genus of Hippoboscidae, containing only one known species, Neolipoptena ferrisi.

References 

Parasitic flies
Hippoboscidae
Hippoboscoidea genera
Monotypic Brachycera genera
Taxa named by Joseph Charles Bequaert